Norzoanthamine is an alkaloid found in soft corals of the genus Zoanthus 

Norzoanthamine has been shown to suppress the loss of bone weight and strength in mice. Some derivatives of norzoanthamine also suppress development of some kind of leukemia cell lines and human platelet aggregation.

A laboratory synthesis of this compound was developed in 2004.

References 

Quinoline alkaloids
Oxygen heterocycles
Epoxides
Heterocyclic compounds with 7 or more rings
Triketones